

Great Britain
Bombay and Madras – Warren Hastings

Portugal
 Angola – António de Lencastre, Governor of Angola (1772–1779)
 Macau – Diogo Fernandes Salema e Saldanha, Governor of Macau (1771–1777)

Colonial governors
Colonial governors
1774